SAF 2205, also known as Sandvik SAF 2205, is a Sandvik-owned trademark for a 22Cr duplex (ferritic-austenitic) stainless steel. SAF derives from Sandvik Austenite Ferrite. The nominal chemical composition of SAF 2205 is 22% chromium, 5% nickel, 3.2% molybdenum and other alloying elements such as nitrogen and manganese. The UNS designation for SAF 2205 is S31803/S32205 and the EN steel no. is 1.4462. SAF 2205 or Duplex 2205 is often used as an alternative to expensive 904L stainless steel owing to similar properties but cheaper ingredients. Duplex stainless steel is available in multiple forms like bars, billets, pipes, tubes, sheets, plates and even processed to fittings and flanges.

Typical properties of SAF 2205 duplex stainless steel are:
 high resistance to stress corrosion cracking (SCC) in chloride-bearing environments
 high resistance to stress corrosion cracking (SCC) in environments containing hydrogen sulphide
 high resistance to general corrosion, pitting corrosion, and crevice corrosion
 high resistance to erosion corrosion and corrosion fatigue
 high mechanical strength - roughly twice the proof strength of austenitic stainless steel
 good weldability
Duplex 2205 Stainless Steel (both austenitic and ferritic) is used in applications that require strength and good corrosion resistance. S31803 was endorsed in year 1996 whereas it underwent number of changes that led to discovery of UNS S32205 which is more widely used. Possible alternates for SAF 2205 are 904L Stainless Steel, UR52N+, 6%Mo and 316L.

Applications of SAF 2205 are in the following industries:
 Transport, storage and chemical processing
 Processing equipment
 High chloride and marine environments
 Oil and gas exploration
 Paper machines, liquor tanks, pulp and paper digesters

See also
 Duplex Stainless Steel
 Ferritic stainless steel
 List of steel producers

References

External links
 Technical data for SAF 2205 (seamless tube and pipe)

Chromium alloys
Stainless steel